Henk Warnas (born 7 December 1943) is a Dutch footballer. He played in five matches for the Netherlands national football team from 1967 to 1968.

References

External links
 

1943 births
Living people
Dutch footballers
Netherlands international footballers
Footballers from Ridderkerk
Association footballers not categorized by position